This is a list of the top selling singles and top sellings albums in Ireland in 2005.

Top selling singles 
"(Is This the Way to) Amarillo" - Tony Christie featuring Peter Kay
"You Raise Me Up" - Westlife
"Lonely" - Akon
"Axel F" - Crazy Frog
"Ghetto Gospel" - 2Pac
"You're Beautiful" - James Blunt
"Don't Cha" - The Pussycat Dolls featuring Busta Rhymes
"JCB Song" - Nizlopi
"Bad Day" - Daniel Powter
"Push the Button" - Sugababes

Top selling albums
Back To Bedlam - James Blunt
Gift Grub 6: The Special One - Mario Rosenstock
Face to Face - Westlife
X&Y - Coldplay
Breakaway - Kelly Clarkson
Curtain Call: The Hits - Eminem
Hot Fuss - The Killers
Confessions on a Dancefloor - Madonna
American Idiot - Green Day
Ancora - Il Divo

Notes:
 *Compilation albums are not included.

See also 
List of songs that reached number one on the Irish Singles Chart
List of artists who reached number one in Ireland

External links 
IRMA Official Site

2005 in Irish music
2005